The Cape Government Railways 2nd Class 2-6-2TT of 1875 was a South African steam locomotive from the pre-Union era in the Cape of Good Hope.

The first mixed traffic locomotives to enter service on the new 3 feet 6 inches Cape gauge mainlines of the Cape Government Railways were 2-6-2 Prairie type side-tank engines which were delivered between 1875 and 1879. Four-wheeled tenders were also acquired and the locomotives could be operated in either a tank or tank-and-tender engine configuration, as circumstances demanded. These locomotives were later designated the Cape 2nd Class.

Cape Government Railways
In 1872, the Cape Government took over the operation of all railways in the Cape of Good Hope and established the Cape Government Railways (CGR). Shortly before, it had been decided to adopt the narrower 3 feet 6 inches gauge instead of the existing 4 feet 8½ inches broad gauge for all further railway expansions, since it would decrease the cost of construction through the difficult terrain which lay inland from the three major ports of the Cape of Good Hope at Cape Town, Port Elizabeth and East London. This narrower gauge is still known as Cape gauge.

Since the operational area within the Colony was so vast, the CGR was divided into three semi-autonomous systems. The Eastern System was headquartered in East London, with A.E. Schmid as Chief Resident Engineer and J.D. Tilney as Locomotive Superintendent. The Midland System was headquartered in Port Elizabeth, with D. Jackson Scott as Chief Resident Engineer and Mr. Edwards as Locomotive Superintendent. The Western System was headquartered in Cape Town, with W.G. Brounger as Chief Resident Engineer as well as Consulting Engineer for the whole CGR, and Michael Stephens as Locomotive Superintendent.

Manufacturers
The first Cape gauge mainline locomotives to enter service on the CGR were delivered in 1875. An order for six  Prairie type locomotives was placed with Robert Stephenson and Company, followed by a separate order for six four-wheeled tenders. The Stephenson locomotives were numbered W1 and W2 for the Western system and M7 to M10 for the Midland System.

At the same time, four more locomotives were ordered from the Avonside Engine Company. Two of the Avonside locomotives went to the Midland System, numbered M5 and M6. The other two were intended for the Eastern System, but they were lost at sea during delivery when the ship Memento sank off East London on 5 February 1876.

These locomotives were followed by nineteen more, all with optional tenders, ordered from three manufacturers.
 Four were delivered from Kitson and Company in 1876, numbered in the range from E17 to E20 for the Eastern system.
 Four were delivered from Avonside Engine Company in 1876 and 1878, numbered in the range from E21 to E24 for the Eastern system.
 Nine more were delivered from Robert Stephenson in 1878 and 1879, numbered in the range from M25 to M33 for the Midland system.
 The last two were delivered from Avonside Engine Company in 1879, numbered E25 and E26 for the Eastern system, to replace the two which had been lost at sea.

When a locomotive classification system was introduced by the CGR, these locomotives were designated 2nd Class.

Characteristics

Tenders
While all the locomotives were delivered with four-wheeled tenders, they could be operated with or without the tenders, as circumstances demanded. In practice, they were used in the tank engine configuration while performing shunting or short-distance work, and in the tank-and-tender configuration when an increased coal and water supply was required during longer distance mainline work.

Brakes
The locomotives were equipped with Clarke's chain brakes. The braking system proved to be unsatisfactory, since breaking of the chain was not uncommon. In one instance this resulted in a bad accident with loss of life while a train was descending the Hex River rail pass.

The chain brake was operated by a  link chain, which was carried on sheaves underneath the train along the centre, connected by coupling hooks between carriages or trucks. Under each vehicle, the chain hanged slack while not in use. It passed under two pulleys which were attached to pulling-rods to operate the wooden brake blocks. To operate the brakes, the chain could be tightened from either end of the train. The guard's van could be used to retard a train on down grades, or to stop the entire train. In the event of a broken or disconnected chain, however, the brake system was useless. By c. 1876, a simple vacuum brake system was introduced as a reserve brake.

Service
One of these locomotives is known to have been named, number W1 Byron. All of them were renumbered on occasions when the CGR altered its locomotive numbering systems c. 1886, 1888, 1890 and 1896.

By 1904, only three of them were still in service, being employed on shunting and construction tasks. By 1912, when locomotive classification and renumbering was implemented on the newly established South African Railways, none of these 2nd Class locomotives were still in service.

Works numbers and renumbering
The builders, works numbers, years built, original numbers and known renumbering of the Cape 2nd Class of 1875 are listed in the table.

Illustration
The photographs illustrate the locomotive in various configurations.

References

0230
2-6-2 locomotives
1C1 locomotives
Robert Stephenson and Company locomotives
Kitson locomotives
Avonside locomotives
Cape gauge railway locomotives
Railway locomotives introduced in 1875
1875 in South Africa
Scrapped locomotives